The Ministers of State of Chile, according to the Chilean constitution, are the direct and immediate collaborators of the President of the Republic in the government and the administration of the state, and in such, they are responsible for the handling of their respective Ministry (Ministerio), in accordance with the policies and instructions that it imparts. The president can appoint and remove ministers freely, and each reports to directly to the president.

List of ministries and their ministers

Gallery

See also
 Ministry General Secretariat of Government (Chile)
 Ministry General Secretariat of the Presidency (Chile)

References

External links 
 Ministers of State Government of Chile website

 
Government ministers of Chile
Chile, Ministries of
Chile